Henry John Snow (February 1811 – 20 January 1874) was an English cricketer with amateur status who was associated with Marylebone Cricket Club (MCC) and made his first-class debut in 1830.

Snow was educated at Eton and St John's College, Cambridge. After graduating he became a Church of England priest and was vicar of Bibury with Winson, Gloucestershire, from 1843 until his death in 1874.

References

1811 births
1874 deaths
People educated at Eton College
Alumni of St John's College, Cambridge
19th-century English Anglican priests
English cricketers
English cricketers of 1826 to 1863
Cambridge University cricketers
Gentlemen cricketers
Marylebone Cricket Club cricketers
Non-international England cricketers
Surrey cricketers
People from Bibury
Gentlemen of Kent cricketers
A to K v L to Z cricketers